State Route 109 (or SR-109) is a state highway in the U.S. state of Utah. The route serves as an east–west connector in the city of Layton in Davis County.

Route description
SR-109 begins at the intersection of SR-126 (Main Street) and Gentile Street in the historic section of Layton, close to the historic Utah Central Railroad and the current-day Union Pacific Railroad, as well as the Layton Frontrunner station. From here, the route travels east along Gentile Street, almost immediately crossing I-15 via an overpass, after which it passes by the Layton city offices and Layton High School. From this point onwards, the route primarily passes by residential subdivisions, crossing Fort Lane and Fairfield Road, the two primary north–south roads in the area. Shortly after Fairfield, the route splits off from Gentile Street, becoming Oak Hills Drive as it continues east-northeast, climbing into the foothills of the Wasatch Mountains, where it ends at a diamond interchange with US 89.

History
SR-109 was originally established in 1931 as the road from SR-1 (US 91) westerly for four miles along what is now Gentile Street in Layton.

In 1969, the route was moved to the east along the same street (Gentile Street) to its current alignment.

In 2021, the at-grade intersection with US 89 at SR-109's eastern terminus was replaced with a grade-separated diamond interchange as part of a major project to reconstruct US 89 as a six-lane freeway between I-15 in Farmington and I-84 in Uintah.

Major intersections

References

External links

109
 109
Streets in Utah